Adam Honory Kirkor (21 January 1818 – 23 November 1886) was a Polish publisher, journalist and archeologist.

Biography 
From 1834 to 1866, he worked in Vilnius, later in Saint Petersburg and Kraków. He was a member of the Vilnius Archaeological Commission from 1855.

Kirkor became a member of the Russian Imperial Archaeological Society in 1856, taking part in the writing of Orgelbrand's Universal Encyclopedia. His name is featured in the first volume of the encyclopedia.

He was not financially successful and went bankrupt, eventually moving to Kraków. Kirkor helped transforming the Kraków Scientific Society into the Academy of Learning, to which he was appointed as member of in 1873. From 1875, he started participating in archaeological excavations near Kraków.

Adam was married to Helena Kirkorowa until 1857 due to her leaving him for another man. After the divorce, he married Maria Celestyna Boczkowska.

See also 
 Orgelbrand's Universal Encyclopedia (1859)

References 

1818 births
1886 deaths
Place of death missing
Polish publishers (people)
19th-century Polish journalists
19th-century Polish archaeologists
19th-century publishers (people)
Polish writers in Belarusian